William Holloway Thompson (24 June 1882 — 19 October 1954) was an English cricketer who played first-class cricket for Derbyshire in 1908.

Thompson was born in Spondon, Derbyshire. He played one game for Derbyshire in the 1908 season, against Leicestershire in July at Derby. He scored 17 runs in the first innings, but was out for a duck in the second. He was a right-handed batsman.

Thompson died 19 October 1954 at Spondon at the age of 72.

References

1882 births
1954 deaths
English cricketers
Derbyshire cricketers
People from Spondon
Cricketers from Derby